Zamia lucayana is a species of plant in the family Zamiaceae. It is endemic to the Bahamas, where it occurs on southeastern Long Island near Clarence Town and Turtle Cove. It is endangered by habitat loss.

References

Flora of the Bahamas
lucayana
Near threatened plants
Endemic flora of the Bahamas
Taxonomy articles created by Polbot